Maria Strong (born 11 March 1971) is an Australian Paralympic athlete. They won a bronze medal in Women's shot put F33 at the 2020 Summer Paralympics.

External links
 Australian Athletics Historical Results

Paralympic athletes of Australia
Athletes (track and field) at the 2020 Summer Paralympics
Medalists at the 2020 Summer Paralympics
Paralympic bronze medalists for Australia
Track and field athletes with cerebral palsy
Cerebral Palsy category Paralympic competitors
Living people
1971 births
Non-binary sportspeople
Australian LGBT sportspeople